Stanley Nyazamba (born January 6, 1983) is a Zimbabwean retired footballer.

Career

College and amateur
Nyazamba moved from his native Zimbabwe to play college soccer at Lee University. He finished his career with 28 goals and 60 assists, becoming the all-time assist leader for Lee, and in his last season he was named to the 2007 All-American First Team, as well as being named a NAIA All-American Scholar Athlete. During his college years Nyazamba also played for the Cape Cod Crusaders of the USL Premier Development League.

Professional
Nyazamba signed with the Richmond Kickers of the USL Second Division in April 2008. He scored 8 goals in 16 games in his debut season, and was named 2008 USL2 Rookie of the Year.

Nyazamba signed a developmental contract with the Columbus Crew on September 15, 2008, filling the roster spot of the waived Ryan Miller.  He made his Black & Gold debut on June 30, 2009 in the Crew's 2009 Lamar Hunt U.S. Open Cup third round match against the Rochester Rhinos, then of the USL First Division. Nyazamba played the full 120 minutes and assisted on the Duncan Oughton goal that sent the match into extra time.

He signed with new USSF Division 2 franchise FC Tampa Bay in March 2010. On February 14, 2011, Nyazamba returned to the Richmond Kickers, signing with the club that had recently moved into the newly formed USL Pro league.

Youth coaching
Nyazamba has also been a youth soccer coach for over 10 years and was in involved in youth travel teams for Columbus Crew and Richmond Kickers. In 2010, he began preschool coaching with Little Kicks before moving to Atlanta, Georgia in February 2014. There he founded his own soccer program Kidz 'n' Kicks Soccer Inc. This is a program designed for kids of ages 2–8.

References

External links
 MLS player profile
 USL Player Profile

1983 births
Living people
Zimbabwean footballers
Zimbabwean expatriate footballers
Cape Cod Crusaders players
Richmond Kickers players
Columbus Crew players
Tampa Bay Rowdies players
Expatriate soccer players in the United States
USL League Two players
USL Second Division players
USSF Division 2 Professional League players
USL Championship players
Association football midfielders